The Castle of la Punta de Amer (Spanish: Castillo de la Punta de Amer) is a 17th century fortification located in Sant Lorenzo des Cardessar on the island of Mallorca. The sandstone structure was built in the late 17th century, and is now a protected site.

References 

Bien de Interés Cultural landmarks in the Balearic Islands
Castles in the Balearic Islands
Buildings and structures in Mallorca
17th-century establishments in Spain